Gordon P. Glisson (October 31, 1930 – February 23, 1997) was an American Champion Thoroughbred horse racing jockey.

Born in Winnsboro, South Carolina, at age fifteen he and his mother moved to Seattle, Washington. He began working at the Longacres Racetrack in nearby Renton, Washington then as an apprentice jockey rode in his first race at the Ak-Sar-Ben Racetrack in Omaha, Nebraska. In 1948, younger brother John Weldon Glisson would also become a jockey.

Within a few years, Gordon Glisson developed into a top jockey and in the 1948-1949 winter racing season he led all jockeys at Santa Anita Park in wins. In 1949 he also rode in New York State where he had four winners in one day and ended the year as the leading jockey in New York and in total won more races than any jockey in the United States. During his outstanding 1949 campaign he won the prestigious Santa Anita Derby with Old Rockport then rode him to a fourth-place finish in the Kentucky Derby and to eighth place in the Preakness Stakes. Among Glisson's other important wins, on January 26, 1950, he rode Miche to a huge upset win over the great Citation in the La Sorpresa Handicap at Santa Anita Park. In 1955, Glisson won another major West Coast event, capturing the Hollywood Gold Cup aboard King Ranch's, Rejected.

A fan favorite, The New Yorker magazine of March 5, 1949 (p. 79) wrote that "What impresses horsemen most is that his style is remarkably like that of the late George Woolf, even to the coolness he shows in tight finishes." In a similar vein, the October 31, 1949, issue of Time magazine did an article on Gordon Glisson titled "The Kid with the Cold Eye".

In 1950, Glisson was the first recipient of the newly created George Woolf Memorial Jockey Award given to a successful Thoroughbred racing jockey in North America who demonstrates high standards of personal and professional conduct, on and off the racetrack. In 2003, he was nominated for the Washington Thoroughbred Racing Hall of Fame.

Gordon Glisson was living in Ojai, California, when he died in 1997 at the Sherman Oaks Burn Center following an accident at his home.

References
 The History of Race Riding and the Jockeys' Guild by Turner Publishing Company (Compiler) (1999) 
 
 
 Obituary excerpt for Gordon Glisson from the February 27, 1997 Los Angeles Daily News
 Corbis photos of Gordon Glisson

1930 births
1997 deaths
American jockeys
American Champion jockeys
People from Winnsboro, South Carolina
Sportspeople from Seattle